Sangaria is a town and municipality in the Hanumangarh district of the Indian state of Rajasthan. It is situated near the northern border of Rajasthan adjoining Haryana and Punjab states.

Demographics
At the time of the India census in 2011, Sangaria had a population of 122,524. Males made up 64,424 of the total population and females 58,100. Sangaria has an average literacy rate of 56.34, lower than the state average of 67.06%. Male literacy was 64.40% and female literacy was 47.41%. In Sangaria, 12.09% of the population was under the age of 6 years.

Tehsils include 26 Gram Panchayats, 188 villages  and 177 developed villages.

Geography and climate
Sangaria, situated at 29°5′N to 30°6′N and 74°3′E to 75°3′E, shares its boundaries with Haryana state to the east, Sriganganagar district to the west, Punjab state to the north and Churu district to the south. The climate of the district is semi-dry, extremely hot during the summer and extremely cold during winter. The maximum  average temperature varies between 18 and 48 °C and the minimum averages between 0 and 28 °C. The average rainfall during the year is 225 to 300 mm

References

Cities and towns in Hanumangarh district